Sergei Lesnukhin (born 9 February 1987) is a Russian former professional ice hockey forward. He played in the Russian Super League (RSL) and Kontinental Hockey League (KHL) with Lokomotiv Yaroslavl, HC Vityaz, Admiral Vladivostok and HC Yugra from 2005 to 2015.

References

External links
 

1987 births
Living people
Admiral Vladivostok players
HC Vityaz players
HC Yugra players
Lokomotiv Yaroslavl players
Russian ice hockey left wingers
Sportspeople from Lipetsk